The SOL is a rugged, waterproof solar-powered laptop computer intended for use in African schools that do not have access to an electrical network. Sol was created by London, Ontario-based WeWi Telecommunications.

Design and features 

The SOL is available in two editions, a standard edition and the Marine edition which uses hydrophobic coating to provide water repletion instead of waterproofing the laptop. The laptop has a reinforced polymer-based clam shell casing that houses the solar panels and makes the laptop more durable. The device uses four detachable monocrystalline photovoltaic panels which fold into the unit.

References

External links 

 

Applications of photovoltaics
Laptops